The Muslim Association Party (MAP) was a political party in the Gold Coast, active from 1954 to 1957.

The MAP grew out of the Gold Coast Muslim Association, which was established as a welfare and social association in 1932. Involved in politics by the early 1950s, it became the Muslim Association Party in 1954. Most of its leaders opposed the ruling Convention People's Party, and the MAP was one of the parties which merged in 1957 to join the United Party.

Further reading
Allman, Jean Marie, "Hewers of Wood, Carriers of Water": Islam, Class, and Politics on the Eve of Ghana's Independence, African Studies Review, 34: 2 (September 1991), pp. 1-26
Balogun, S. U., Muslim participation in the independence struggle of the Gold Coast, Journal of Muslim Minority Affairs, Volume 8, Issue 1 (January 1987), pp. 176-182

References

Political parties established in 1954
Political parties disestablished in 1957
Defunct political parties in Ghana
Islam in Ghana
1954 establishments in Gold Coast (British colony)